Psi World is a role-playing game published by Fantasy Games Unlimited in 1984.

Description
Psi World is a science-fiction system set approximately in the 21st century and featuring the widespread use of psionic powers. Psionic characters (like the PCs) are oppressed by an intolerant society and the government. The rules cover character creation, skills, psionic powers, combat, and "the World." The game includes two introductory scenarios and a GM's screen.

Publication history
Psi World was designed by Del Carr and Cheron, with art by Bill Willingham and Matt Wagner, and was published in 1984 by Fantasy Games Unlimited as a boxed set with a 32-page book, a 30-page book, a cardstock screen, a sample character sheet, and dice.

In 1985, William H. Keith, Jr. and J. Andrew Keith expanded into Fantasy Games Unlimited's game lines including Psi World.

Reception
Chris Baylis reviewed Psi World for Imagine magazine, and stated that "I would suggest that this is a system for the slightly more mature player, not for the young and blood-thirsty beat-'em-up brigade. Much thought and planning is required by both GM and player, and character interaction and party cooperation is a must for survival and enjoyment."

Lawrence Schick commented: "Feel persecuted just because you're better than everyone else? This game is for you!"

Reviews
Different Worlds #44
White Wolf #7 (1987)
 Casus Belli #24 (Feb 1985)

References

Fantasy Games Unlimited games
Role-playing games introduced in 1984
Science fiction role-playing games